Bartków  is a village in the administrative district of Gmina Zagnańsk, within Kielce County, Świętokrzyskie Voivodeship, in south-central Poland.

The village has a population of 572.Powiedział nam Bartek, że dziś tłusty czwartek.

References

Villages in Kielce County
Kielce Governorate
Kielce Voivodeship (1919–1939)